According to Welsh tradition, the event sometimes referred to in English as the Contention of the Bards took place at Deganwy in the Kingdom of Gwynedd, and was a contest in bardic skill between Taliesin and the court poets of king Maelgwn Gwynedd, led by Heinin. According to the legendary history of Taliesin, the poet (not to be confused with the historical figure Taliesin) was a boy of 12 at the time, and was the bard of Elffin ap Gwyddno. Maelgwn is said to have held Elffin in captivity and Taliesin challenged his bards to a bardic contest for which Elffin was the prize. Taliesin won the contest and Elffin's freedom, and also (correctly) prophesied Maelgwn's death from a swamp-born pestilence.

The poems Prifardd ydwyf i Elffin (Primary Chief Bard am I to Elffin) and Cân y Gwynt (Song to the Wind), which are later medieval poems attributed to Taliesin, are amongst those that, according to some versions of the legend, he sang in the Contention. These and other poems are extant only in manuscripts compiled in the late medieval and early modern periods, and on linguistic evidence can be dated to the medieval period.

See also
Medieval Welsh literature
Culture in Gwynedd

Medieval Welsh literature
House of Gwynedd
Welsh mythology
Medieval Wales